Dizan may refer to:
 Dizicheh, a city in Isfahan Province, Iran
 Duzan, a village in Lorestan Province, Iran
 Dizan, Alborz, a village in Alborz Province, Iran
 Dizan, Qazvin, a village in Qazvin Province, Iran
 Dizan, Yazd, a village in Yazd Province, Iran